Caravans to Empire Algol is the debut studio album by the Norwegian dark ambient project Neptune Towers. It was released on December 12, 1994 by Moonfog Productions. Sole band member Fenriz considered this to be the first of the two chapters of the Empire Algol saga, the second (and final) being the next Neptune Towers album, Transmissions from Empire Algol.

Track listing
 All tracks written and arranged by Fenriz.

Personnel
 Fenriz - keyboards, producer, recording, engineering

External links 
[ Allmusic.com]
Billboard.com

References 

1994 debut albums